Andre Waismann (Portuguese: André Waisman)  is an Israeli doctor and medical practitioner, notable for development of the ANR treatment of Opiate addiction. Waismann currently serves as the head of the ANR unit at the Barzilai Medical Center and director at the ANR Clinic in Florida, US.

Biography
Waismann was born in  Brazil in 1958. He studied medicine at Brazil's Serra dos Órgãos University Center in Teresópolis, where he received his doctor degree in 1981. He immigrated  the same year to Israel and was drafted to a military service in the Givati Brigade, where he served as a doctor. After completing his service with the Israel Defense Forces, Waismann worked as a doctor in the intensive care unit in the Barzilai Medical Center in Ashkelon. In 1989, Waismann was drafted to the Israeli Police, as a Superintendent, serving as the Jerusalem county doctor.
 
In 1994, Waismann established intensive care unit for treating addiction to opiates. In 2002 he helped to establish a treatment center in Jalandhar, India using the ANR method. In 2012, Waismann established an ANR unit for treatment of addiction in the Barzilai Medical Center. In 2013,  Waismann opened a clinic to treat addicts in the FMI hospital in Switzerland. Waismann also served as a consultant for the ASA Bangasa foundation in Indonesia.

Waismann also served as the medical director for addiction treatment in the LOGO center and San Raffaele Hospital in Italy. In October 2018 Waismann was invited to speak at the United Nations human rights convention about methods to cope with the international opiates crisis

ANR Method for treating opiate addiction

From 1993, Waismann started to treat opiate addiction using a relatively new technique named Ultra Rapid Opiate Detoxification (UROD). This method was used until 1997, when Waismann redefined this treatment method and renamed it ANR - Accelerated Neuro-Regulation. The principle on which the ANR therapy is based is the acceleration of the withdrawal symptoms while the patient is under sedation to prevent redundant pain and suffering as a result from these withdrawal symptoms. When the patient is under deep sedation in an intensive care unit, specific drugs are used to block the additional opioid receptors caused by frequent  opioid use that generate the craving for the drug in the brain. During this time, the medical staff accelerates the regulation between the levels of endorphins and the opioid receptors until achieving a balance between them. The ANR treatment method is currently conducted in a number of medical centers in India, Switzerland, Israel, and from 2019 in the state of Florida, USA.

Selective works and publications
 M. Y. Mudaliar, A Waismann, J Currie, L Cruz, Opioid neuroreceptor blockade with naltrexone under sedative anaesthesia in a 6-year-old child with iatrogenic morphine addiction following resection of a desmoplastic infantile ganglioglimoa at age 9 months, Anaesthesia and Intensive Care subscriber, Volume 27, Issue 1
 Andre Waismann, Alternative approaches to battling opioid dependency, Florida Weekly, 15 August 2019
 Andre Waismann, To end the opioid crisis, we need to change the way we think about the addiction, Washington Examiner, 23 July 2019

Personal life
Waismann lives in moshav Ge'a. He is married to Efrat Waismann. They have six children. Since the end of 2018,  Waismann lives in the United States, where he works as a private consultant for American medical centers.

See also
 Drug addiction

References

Further reading
 Shannon Davis, HSC to open new, advanced detox center, the University Daily, Vol 75, Issue 116, Texas Tech, 29 March 2000
 Robin Eisner, Hospital Offers Addicts a Choice, ABC News, 6 January 2006
ANR Switzerland, treatments in Switzerland www.anr-switzerland.ch
Publikation in "Suchtmedizin" - 20. Int. Kongress für Suchtmedizin in München Juli 2019;

External links
 The ANR Treatment, Fox News, 2007 YouTube

Israeli military doctors
Living people
People from Rio de Janeiro (city)
1958 births
Israeli corporate directors
Brazilian Jews